Sami Belgroun (born 12 April 1975) is an Algerian judoka.

Achievements

References
 

1975 births
Living people
Algerian male judoka
Judoka at the 2000 Summer Olympics
Judoka at the 2004 Summer Olympics
Olympic judoka of Algeria
21st-century Algerian people
20th-century Algerian people
African Games medalists in judo
Competitors at the 1999 All-Africa Games
Competitors at the 2003 All-Africa Games
African Games silver medalists for Algeria
African Games bronze medalists for Algeria